Des Moines Township is a township in Lee County, Iowa.

History
Des Moines Township was originally called Ambrosia Township. Ambrosia Township was organized in 1841, and the name was changed to Des Moines in 1842.

References

Townships in Lee County, Iowa
Townships in Iowa